Rai Radio 3 Classica is a radio channel, owned and produced by the Italian State broadcaster RAI, which broadcasts uninterrupted classical music without commercials.

Until August 2015 it was known as Rai Radio FD 5, and before that as FD Auditorium. From 2015 till 2017 the station was called Rai Radio 5 Classica. Until 31 December 2019 it was called Rai Radio Classica.

The channel is distributed via:
the cable radio service Filodiffusione, which was launched in 1958 by RAI and SIP (now Telecom Italia)
the Hot Bird satellite using DAB technology
the digital terrestrial DVB-T network (available in Italy only)
 Internet Portal Rai Play Radio

Rai Radio 3 Classica, unlike its sister channel Rai Radio Tutta Italiana, can also be heard on FM in five Italian cities: Rome (on 100.3 MHz), Turin (101.8), Milan (102.2), Naples (103.9), and Ancona (106.0). It is also relayed overnight by Rai Radio 3, generally between 2 AM (1:30 on Saturday and Sunday) and 6. From September 2017 to August 2022 Rai Radio 3 had its own night programming. Rai Radio TRST A also relays Rai Radio 3 Classica daily from 19:35 till 06:58 hrs on FM in the area of Trieste.

Earlier logos

External links
 Official Site 
 Live Streaming 
 Streaming with player

Free-to-air
Radio stations in Italy
Cable radio
Classical music radio stations
Radio stations established in 1958
RAI radio stations